Kaliya Ashley Ross, known professionally as Kali, is an American rapper from Roswell, Georgia of Panamanian descent . She is noted for her songs poking fun at past partners and her carefree attitude.

Career
She began rapping at the age of 12. She began rapping after an arrangement made with her father to write 13 songs in order to have her own bedroom. In November 2020, she received traction with the popularity of her track "Do A Bitch" on the social media platform TikTok. In 2021, she released her debut mixtape This Is Why They Mad Now with a remix of her breakthrough song "Do A Bitch" by American rapper Rico Nasty. In November 2021, she released the remix to her song "MMM MMM" with American rappers Latto and Moneybagg Yo. In February 2022, she went on tour alongside rappers Latto, Saucy Santana, and Asianae. On March 8, 2022, she released her single "Standards" in the occasion of the International Women's Day. Also in March 2022, she released her project Toxic Chocolate with appearances from Latto, Yung Bleu, Moneybagg Yo, Bia, and ATL Jacob. In June 2022, she was selected as part of the 2022 XXL Freshman class.

Musical style
During an interview with HipHopDx, she cited her musical influences as rappers Nicki Minaj and Cardi B, as well as American R&B singer Aaliyah.

References

External links 
 

21st-century American women musicians
Living people
People from Roswell, Georgia
People from Georgia (U.S. state)
Rappers from Georgia (U.S. state)
Southern hip hop musicians
Year of birth missing (living people)